The End of an Ear is the debut solo album by Soft Machine's Robert Wyatt.

Background
The album was recorded in August 1970, while Wyatt took a break from Soft Machine, the band he would leave the following year. Containing mostly free jazz and experimental music, the music has no lyrics, only vocal experimentation by Wyatt. It includes Soft Machine's Elton Dean on saxophone and Caravan's Dave Sinclair (who, in 1971, would join Wyatt in the group Matching Mole) on organ. About half of the album is filled by a two-part cover of Gil Evans' "Las Vegas Tango". The track "To Carla, Marsha and Caroline (For Making Everything Beautifuller)" is based on the music of "Instant Pussy", a song Wyatt first recorded solo during a Soft Machine BBC session in late 1969 and which appeared, also in instrumental form, on Matching Mole's first album.

Re-issue
The album was re-issued, in remastered form, with a booklet and fully restored artwork and essay, by Esoteric Recordings in July 2012.

Paul Sexton of Prog magazine commented: "It begins with deranged, high-speed voices like something out of The Goon Show, in a vaguely Latin mood and set to discordant piano. It ends 47 minutes later having made barely a concession to the protocols of melody, lyrics or song construction. The debut solo album by Robert Wyatt was a law unto itself in 1970 and is just as enigmatic today." While Marcus O'Dair of Jazzwise magazine said, "At moments it sounds like free jazz, at others modernist sound collage, at one point, Hendrix's "Purple Haze"."

Track listing
All tracks composed by Robert Wyatt, except where indicated
Side A
"Las Vegas Tango Part 1 (Repeat)" (Gil Evans) (8:13)
"To Mark Everywhere"  (2:26)
"To Saintly Bridget" (2:22)
"To Oz Alien Daevyd and Gilly" (2:09)
"To Nick Everyone" (9:15)
Side B
"To Caravan and Brother Jim" (5:22)
"To the Old World (Thank You For the Use of Your Body, Goodbye)" (3:18)
"To Carla, Marsha and Caroline (For Making Everything Beautifuller)" (2:47)
"Las Vegas Tango Part 1" (Gil Evans) (11:07)

The song titles refer to the following people or groups: Mark Ellidge (Wyatt's half brother), Bridget St John, Daevid Allen and Gilli Smyth, Nick Evans, Caravan and Jimmy Hastings, Kevin Ayers' The Whole World, Carla Bley, Marsha Hunt and Caroline Coon.

Personnel
 Robert Wyatt - drums, piano, organ, keyboards, harmonica
 Neville Whitehead - bass
 Mark Charig - cornet
 Elton Dean - alto saxophone, saxello
 Mark Ellidge - piano
 Cyrille Ayers - assorted percussion
 Dave Sinclair - organ

Technical
 Vic Gamm - engineer

References

 album info

Robert Wyatt albums
1970 debut albums
Albums produced by Robert Wyatt
Free jazz albums
CBS Records albums
Columbia Records albums